Swati A. Dandekar (was born March 6, 1951) is a former Iowa state legislator and former U.S. Executive Director at the Asian Development Bank.
She is a Democratic member of the Iowa Utilities Board, awaiting Senate confirmation in 2012. Previously, she was a member of the Iowa House of Representatives for the 36th District from 2003 to 2009 and a member of the Iowa Senate for the 18th District from 2009 to 2011. She received her B.S. degree in Biology and Chemistry from Nagpur University and a graduate diploma in dietetics from University of Mumbai.  Dandekar serves as the Chair (formerly President) of the National Foundation for Women Legislators and as a board member of the Iowa Math and Science Coalition, the Greater Cedar Rapids Foundation, and the Belin-Blank International Center for Gifted & Talented. Dandekar previously served on the Iowa Association of School Boards, and as a board member of the Women in Public Policy (Iowa Charter), and the U.S. Center for Citizen Diplomacy.  On July 23, 2013 Dandekar announced that she would be running for the U.S. Congress from the 1st congressional district; she lost in the primary to former state house speaker Pat Murphy, who himself lost to Rod Blum.

Political history 
Before her election to the Iowa General Assembly, Dandekar was a two-term member of the Linn-Mar Community School District Board from 1996 to 2002. During that time, Governor Tom Vilsack appointed her to the Vision Iowa Board, a post she held from 2000 to 2002. She began her legislative career in 2002, winning an election to the Iowa House District 36, defeating Republican Karen Balderston. She won re-election twice, against Republican Cory Crowly in 2004 and Republican Nick Wagner in 2006, before running for the Iowa Senate. In 2008, Dandekar defeated Republican Joe Childers for election to Iowa Senate District 18, and served there until resigning in 2011 to accept Governor Terry Branstad's appointment to the Iowa Utilities Board for a term expiring in 2015.

While in the House, Dandekar served on the Appropriations, Economic Growth, and Economic Development Appropriations Subcommittee during all three terms, and served on the Education committee during her first term and the Transportation committee during her third term.  While in the Senate, she served on the Commerce, Economic Growth, Rebuild Iowa, Transportation, and Ways and Means committees, while reprising her role as a member of the Economic Development Appropriations Subcommittee.

Recognition
Dandekar has received several awards, including the J. C. Penney Education Golden Rule award, the 2003 Pillar of the Community award from Waypoint, recognition as a 2004 Flemming Institute Fellow and recognition by the Elliott School of International Affairs' Global Economic Conference.  In addition, she has been named Person of the Year three times, once in 2002 by India Abroad, once in 2003 by the Asian Alliance of Iowa, and once in 2008 by AsianWeek.

During her 2014 campaign for the Iowa 1st Congressional District Democratic primary, Dandekar was formally endorsed by the National Organization for Women.

Electoral history

Personal life
Dandekar and her husband, Arvind, have two adult sons.

References

External links

 
Senator Swati Dandekar at The Iowa Legislature

 

1951 births
Living people
Democratic Party members of the Iowa House of Representatives
Indian emigrants to the United States
Politicians from Nagpur
Women state legislators in Iowa
University of Mumbai alumni
Rashtrasant Tukadoji Maharaj Nagpur University alumni
Democratic Party Iowa state senators
School board members in Iowa
People from Marion, Iowa
American people of Marathi descent
Candidates in the 2014 United States elections
21st-century American politicians
21st-century American women politicians
American politicians of Indian descent
Asian-American people in Iowa politics